Cacaulândia  is a municipality in the Brazilian state of Rondônia. 
It has a Tropical savanna climate.
As of 2019 the estimated population was 6230.

Geography

Cacaulândia is in the state of Rondônia, Brazil.

History

Cacaulândia has its origins in a Northwest Brazil Integrated Development Program (Polonoroeste) project to support farmers in the region through a Núcleo Urbano de Apoio Rural (NUAR: Urban Center of Rural Support).
It was named Cacaulândia because it was a large cocoa producing region.
 of land were donated for the NUAR from lots at the intersection of TB-65 with Line C-15.
The region was split off from the municipality of Ariquemes on 13 February 1992, and became a separate municipality and district named Cacaulândia.
As of 2007 it remained a municipality with one district.

Climate

The Köppen climate type is Aw : Tropical savanna climate.

Demographics

The population in the 2010 census was 5,736.
The estimated population as of 2020 was 6,269.
As of 2010, 95.5% of the population had attended school between the ages of 6 and 14. 
Also as of 2010, the municipal Human Development Index was 0.646.
This compares to 0.283 in 1991 and 0.454 in 2000.

On the 2010 census religion was reported as Catholic by 3,071 people, Evangelical by 1,607 people and Animism by 0 people.

In 2017, the average monthly salary of formal workers was 2.1 minimum wages. 
Formally employed people were 7.6% of the total population. 
Households with monthly income of up to half a minimum wage per person represent 41.2% of the population.
Recent estimates of GDP per capita:

Health and sanitation

21.8% of households have adequate sanitation, 21.9% of urban households are on public roads with afforestation and 1.5% of urban households are on public roads with adequate urbanization (presence of manhole, sidewalk, pavement and curb).
Annual hospitalizations due to diarrhea are 0.5 per 1,000 inhabitants.
Deaths per 1,000 live births:

Municipal finances
Recent figures for committed municipal expenditure:
Recent figures for realized municipal revenue:

References

Sources

Municipalities in Rondônia